Ninos may refer to:
Ninus, founder of Nineveh
Tukulti-Ninurta (disambiguation), several ancient kings 
Nineveh, in Greek sources 
Ninos (name), a popular (male) Assyrian forename, and less commonly surname

See also
Nino (disambiguation)